Kuch... Diiil Se is a Hindi language Indian television talk show series hosted by Smriti Irani, which premiered on SAB TV on 23 June 2003. The series is a discussion based show which primarily focuses on social issues where lawyers, cops, psychiatrists, doctors, social workers and celebrities answer viewer queries.

References

Indian television talk shows
Sony SAB original programming
2003 Indian television series debuts